The Nauvoo Expositor was a newspaper in Nauvoo, Illinois, that published only one issue, on June 7, 1844. Its publication, the destruction of the printed copies (which, according  to the Nauvoo Charter, was the legal consequence of a newspaper deemed a public nuisance by the city council, including Joseph Smith), and the destruction of the printing press by the mob who followed the sheriff sent to collect the printed papers, set off a chain of events that led to Smith's death.

The Expositor was founded by several seceders from the Church of Jesus Christ of Latter Day Saints and some non-Mormons in the Nauvoo area. The single edition of the newspaper was critical of Smith and other church leaders. Specifically, Smith was criticized for teaching doctrines such as  plural marriage and exaltation (the ability to become gods by creating and peopling new worlds).

In response to the newspaper's publication, Smith and the Nauvoo City Council declared the paper a public nuisance, and ordered the copies of the printed edition of the paper to be destroyed. The town marshal carried out the order during the evening of June 10.  As the sheriff set out to collect and destroy the printed pages, a mob began to follow him.  Angry at the inflammatory articles in the paper, the mob, without consent of the city council, proceeded into the printing office and destroyed the press itself.

The destruction of the press led to charges of riot against Smith and other members of the council. After Smith surrendered on the charges, he was also charged with treason against Illinois. Smith was killed by a mob while awaiting a trial in Carthage Jail.

Background and origins

A group of former members of the church were in open conflict with Smith for various doctrinal, economic, and political reasons.

Although he publicly denied being involved in polygamy, it was known within the church that Smith was married to multiple women. In 1842, former church leader John C. Bennett made public allegations of Smith's unorthodox marriages. On August 12, 1843,  Hyrum Smith read Smith's revelation concerning plural marriage to the Nauvoo High Council.

William Law was a member of the First Presidency. According to Law, Smith had made several proposals to Law's wife Jane, under the premise that Jane Law would enter a polyandrous marriage with Smith. Law's wife later described Smith's proposals, saying that Smith had "asked her to give him half her love; she was at liberty to keep the other half for her husband." On January 8, 1844, Smith removed Law from the First Presidency. On April 18, 1844, Law and his wife were excommunicated from the church, along with his brother Wilson Law, a brigadier general in the Nauvoo Legion. Also excommunicated were Robert D. Foster and Howard Smith.

On May 1, Francis M. Higbee filed a legal complaint in the Fifth Judicial District of Illinois, suing Smith for slander and requesting damages of five thousand dollars.

On May 10, a newspaper prospectus was circulated, announcing the creation of the Nauvoo Expositor.

On May 18, the church excommunicated Higbee, James Blakesley, Charles Ivins, and Austin Cowles for apostasy. On May 29, the high council published a document purporting to show Higbee's brother Chauncey had also committed misdeeds.

On May 23, Law obtained a grand jury indictment against Smith on the charge of polygamy from the Hancock County Circuit Court. Law swore that Smith had been living with Maria Lawrence "in an open state of adultery" since October 12, 1843.

The Expositor was planned as an exposé of church practices which Law and his associates opposed.

Creators
The publishers of the Expositor were
 William Law of the First Presidency, and his brother, Brigadier General Wilson Law of the Nauvoo Legion, 
 Charles Ivins, 
 Col. Francis M. Higbee of Nauvoo Legion, and his brother Chauncey L. Higbee, 
 Brothers Robert and Charles Foster.
The editor was Sylvester Emmons, a non-Mormon member of the Nauvoo City Council.

Contents

The only issue of the Nauvoo Expositor, dated June 7, 1844, was a four-page publication. In addition to more mundane content such as poetry and marriage announcements, it contained a statement from the "Seceders from the Church at Nauvoo" and sworn statements from multiple individuals attesting to the teaching of "the plurality of wives".

Prospectus from Publishers
In their prospectus, the publishers advocate for major reforms including the repeal of the Nauvoo City Charter. They vow to "decry moral imperfections" wherever found, "whether in the Plebeian, Patrician, or self-constituted monarch".

Statement from Seceders
The preamble establishes that despite the schism, the authors maintain their belief in "the religion of the Latter Day Saints, as originally taught by Joseph Smith".

The statement discusses the schism, attributed to "many items of doctrine, as now taught, some of which, however, are taught secretly, and denied openly" which they declare "heretical and damnable". They cite the practice of plural marriage, accusing Smith and other church leaders of using their ecclesiastical position to coerce recently arrived female converts into becoming Smith's "spiritual wi[ves]". They also cite the "false doctrine of many Gods", saying "[i]t is contended that there are innumerable Gods as much above the God that presides over this universe, as he is above us; and if he varies from the law unto which he is subjected, he, with all his creatures, will be cast down as was Lucifer". The statement criticizes the process behind the recent excommunication, writing "Smith has established an inquisition"—a process they "contend is contrary to the book of Doctrine and Covenants, for our law condemnest no man until he is heard."

The statement suggests that their struggle will be on-going, writing: "We most solemnly and sincerely declare that the sword of truth shall not depart from the thigh, nor the buckler from the arm, until we can enjoy those glorious privileges which nature's God and our country's laws have guarantied to us—freedom of speech, the liberty of the press, and the right to worship God as seemeth us good." The authors resolve not to "acknowledge any man as king or law-giver to the church" and vow to oppose "every attempt to unite church and state." They accuse Smith and other church officials of introducing "false and damnable doctrines into the Church, such as a plurality of Gods above the God of this universe, and his liability to fall with all his creations; the plurality of wives, for time and eternity, the doctrine of unconditional sealing up to eternal life, against all crimes except that of shedding innocent blood."

Affidavits

The Expositor contained affidavits alleging the teaching of a revelation from Smith which "authorized certain men to have more wives than one at a time." Statements were made by William Law, his wife Jane, and Austin Cowles.

Reception and destruction

Smith called a meeting of the City Council, where "he proceeded to put the Expositor and its editors on trial, as if that body was of a judicial instead of a legislative character." The trial "lasted all of Saturday, June 8, and a part of Monday, June 10."

After the city council declared the Expositor a public nuisance, Smith issued two orders for the Expositors destruction. City Marshall John P. Greene, accompanied by a posse of several hundred, carried out the destruction.

The members of the Nauvoo municipal government were: 

 Mayor Joseph Smith 
 Councilor Hyrum Smith
 Councilor John Taylor
 Councilor Sylvester Emmons 
 Councilor Jonhnson 
 Councilor Benjamin Warrington
 Councilor Hunter 
 Alderman Samuel C. Bennett
 Alderman Elias Smith

Aftermath of the destruction of the Nauvoo Expositor

Seeking relief from the state courts, Francis M. Higbee, one of the Expositor'''s publishers, gave a sworn statement about the events of June 10.  Non-Mormons in Hancock County were infuriated when they heard of the news of the destruction of the Nauvoo Expositor, believing that it was an example of Mormon disregard for their laws.  Many of them called for the arrest of the Mormon leaders, including the neighboring newspapers Quincy Whig and Warsaw Signal.  On June 12, the Hancock County Justice of the Peace issued a warrant for the arrest of Smith and 17 other named individuals under the jurisdiction of the Hancock County Court.  Specifically named were: Joseph Smith, Samuel Bennett, John Taylor, William W. Phelps, Hyrum Smith, John P. Greene, Stephen Perry, Dimick B. Huntington, Jonathan Dunham, Stephen Markham, William Edwards, Jonathan Holmes, Jesse P. Harmon, John Lytle, Joseph W. Coolidge, Harvey D. Redfield, Porter Rockwell, and Levi Richards.

First arrest attempt

Constable David Bettisworth was tasked with arresting Smith and conveying him to the Hancock County Court. On June 12, Bettisworth served Smith with the warrant. Rather than return with Bettisworth to the Hancock County Court, Smith instead petitioned the Municipal Court of Nauvoo to dismiss the charges.

On June 12, a hearing was held in the Municipal Court of Nauvoo. The Court dismissed the charges against Smith. The following day, Smith presided over the Municipal Court of Nauvoo when it dismissed the charges against the others named in the Hancock County Court warrant. Unable to compel Smith to return, Bettisworth left Nauvoo without Smith or any of the others named in the arrest warrant.

Wider response in Illinois
On June 13, citizens of Hancock County gathered in the county seat for a mass-meeting in response to the destruction of the Expositor. The meeting resolved to seek help from the Governor, writing: 
Whereas said Smith and others refuse to obey the mandate of said writ; and whereas in the opinion of this meeting, it is impossible for said officer so raise a posse of sufficient strength to execute said writ; ... it is the opinion of this meeting that the circumstances of the case require the interposition of executive power. Therefore, 
Resolved, that a deputation of two discreet men be sent to Springfield to solicit such interposition. 

The following day, the Warsaw Signal published the resolutions, editorializing that "[r]epeated attempts have been made to arrest Smith, but he has been uniformly screened from the officers of Justice, by the aid of the Municipal Court [of Nauvoo], which is the tool and echo of himself."

On June 14, Smith defended the destruction of the Expositor to Governor Thomas Ford, writing:
In the investigation it appeared evident to the council that the proprietors were a set of unprincipled men, lawless, debouchees, counterfeiters, Bogus Makers, gamblers, peace disturbers, and that the grand object of said proprietors was to destroy our constitutional rights and chartered privileges; to overthrow all good and wholesome regulations in society; to strengthen themselves against the municipality; to fortify themselves against the church of which I am a member, and destroy all our religious rights and privileges, by libels, slanders, falsehoods, perjury & sticking at no corruption to accomplish their hellish purposes. and that said paper of itself was libelous of the deepest dye, and very injurious as a vehicle of defamation,—tending to corrupt the morals, and disturb the peace, tranquillity and happiness of the whole community, and especially that of Nauvoo.

Smith declared martial law on June 18 and called out the Nauvoo Legion, an organized city militia of about 5,000 men. Paragraph 6.

On June 21 Governor Ford arrived at the Hancock County seat in Carthage. On June 22, Ford wrote to the Mayor and City Council of Nauvoo, writing:
I now express to you my opinion that your conduct in the destruction of the press was a very gross outrage upon the laws and the liberties of the people. It may have been full of libels, but this did not authorize you to destroy it.
There are many newspapers in this state which have been wrongfully abusing me for more than a year, and yet such is my regard for the liberty of the press and the rights of a free people in a republican government that I would shed the last drop of my blood to protect those presses from any illegal violence. 
 ... 
The owners of the press obtained ... a warrant against the authors of this destruction for a riot; 
 ... 
They [the Defendants] have ever since refused to be arrested or to submit to a trial at any other place or before any other court, except in the city and before the Municipal Court [of Nauvoo].

Smith fled the jurisdiction to avoid arrest, crossing the Mississippi River into Iowa. On June 23, a posse under the command of the governor entered Nauvoo to execute an arrest warrant, but they were unable to locate Smith.

Surrender and the death of the Smiths

On June 25, 1844, Joseph and Hyrum Smith, along with the other fifteen co-defendants, surrendered to Bettisworth on the original charge of inciting a riot. An arraignment was held on the rioting charge and Justice Robert F. Smith granted bail of $500 for each of the defendants.

After the defendants were granted bail on the riot charge, Justice R. F. Smith heard testimony from Augustine Spencer and issued a writ for the arrest of Joseph and Hyrum Smith on the charge of treason against Illinois. The Smiths were placed under arrest and transported to Carthage Jail.

On June 27, while awaiting trial, a mob attacked the jail and killed both Joseph and Hyrum Smith; John Taylor was wounded in the attack.

Repeal of Nauvoo Charter and Exodus
At the next session of the Illinois state legislature the following December, the Nauvoo Charter was repealed by a vote of 25–14 in the Senate and 75–31 in the House. This disincorporated the City of Nauvoo and dissolved its municipal institutions. Nauvoo municipal assets were court-ordered to be placed in receivership.

The winter of 1845–46 saw the enormous preparations for the Mormon Exodus via the Mormon Trail. In early 1846, the majority of the Latter Day Saints left the city.

Legal analysis
A detailed legal analysis of the Nauvoo City Council's actions was undertaken in 1965 by Dallin H. Oaks, then a professor at the University of Chicago Law School. Oaks opined that while the destruction of the Expositors printing press was legally questionable, under the law of the time the newspaper could have been declared libelous and therefore a public nuisance by the Nauvoo City Council. As a result, Oaks concludes that while under contemporaneous law it would have been legally permissible for city officials to destroy, or "abate," the actual printed newspapers, the destruction of the printing press itself was probably outside of the council's legal authority, and its owners could have sued for damages.

References

 External links 

 Nauvoo Expositor (wikisource)
 Nauvoo Expositor : Facsimile of the Expositor'', with original columns and formatting.
 1840 Nauvoo Charter (wikisource)
 Illinois Constitution of 1818 (wikisource)

1844 in Christianity
1844 in Illinois
1844 disestablishments
Criticism of Mormonism
Defunct newspapers published in Illinois
History of the Latter Day Saint movement
Latter Day Saint movement in Illinois
Mormonism-related controversies
Nauvoo, Illinois
Publications established in 1844
Works about Joseph Smith